Marva is a given name. Notable people with the name include:
Marva Beck (born 1944), American politician
 Marva Collins (1936–2015), American educator
Marva Dawn (1948-2021), American Christian theologian, author, musician and educator
Marva Hicks
 Marva Jean Brooks
Marva Josie, American jazz singer
 Marva Mollet (born 1943), the Belgian singer known professionally as Marva
Marva Smith, American judge
 Marva Whitney (1944–2012), American funk singer
Marva Wright (1948-2010) American blues singer

See also

 Marwa (name)
 Marwah (disambiguation)